German submarine U-768 was a Type VIIC U-boat of Nazi Germany's Kriegsmarine during World War II.

Design
German Type VIIC submarines were preceded by the shorter Type VIIB submarines. U-768 had a displacement of  when at the surface and  while submerged. She had two shafts and two  propellers.

U-768 was fitted with five  torpedo tubes (four fitted at the bow and one at the stern), fourteen torpedoes, one  SK C/35 naval gun, (220 rounds), one  Flak M42 and two twin  C/30 anti-aircraft guns. The boat had a complement of between forty-four and sixty.

References

Bibliography

External links

World War II submarines of Germany
German Type VIIC submarines
1943 ships
Ships built in Wilhelmshaven
U-boats sunk in collisions
U-boats sunk in 1943
U-boats commissioned in 1943
World War II shipwrecks in the Baltic Sea
Maritime incidents in November 1943